The Sanhuangjing (Book of Three Emperors), also known as the Sanhuang Neiwen or the Sanhuangwen, is a fundamental Daoist book which claims those who chant it can become an emperor.

The Daoist master Zheng Yin reportedly transmitted such texts as the Sanhuang Neiwen, which Zheng considered to be among the most important alchemical scriptures, to Ge Hong during the Jin dynasty. According to Ge, the Sanhuangjing was mainly about controlling and summoning ghosts and spirits, talismans and charts, and methods of meditation, and thus was a talismanic book.

All copies of the Sanhuangjing were ordered burned by Emperor Taizong of Tang in 647 CE, due to its supposed ability to bestow imperial status upon the reader. The Chongxuan school Daoist master Cheng Xuanying participated in its investigation.

Fragments of the Sanhuangjing exist in the Daozang.

Notes

Ge Hong - historyofalchemy.com
The Book of the Three Emperors - Daoinfo.org
Forming the Image of Cheng Xuanying (ca.600-690)

Taoist texts